The Union of Federalists and Independent Republicans (UFERI) is a political party in Democratic Republic of the Congo. Since the actual electoral strength of the political parties in Congo is not known, the size of the party cannot be determined.  

It was founded in August 1990 by former First State Commissioner Jean Nguza Karl-i-Bond, who led the party until he fell ill in May 1994. Gabriel Kyungu wa Kumwanza, then governor of Shaba region, was then named the president of the party, but a faction led by Karl-I-Bond's wife Wivine split from the organization, leaving Kyungu with the remainder of the party in Shaba region (now Katanga Province).

To the present day, most of the party's membership and leadership comes from the Katanga region, and the earlier days of the party's existence was filled with ethnopolitical battles between the predominantly-BaLunda UFERI and the predominantly-BaLuba of Karl-I-Bond's rival Kyungu Wa Kumwanza.

It, along with the UDPS and the PDSC, was part of the short-lived opposition-based Sacred Union in 1991, but was kicked out after Karl-I-Bond accepted the position of prime minister from Mobutu that year.

In 1998, Kyungu was given the ambassadorship of the DRC to Kenya by then-president Laurent Kabila; the Kenyan president's office was sent a letter of protest by UDPS against the appointment of Kyungu by Kabila due to Kyungu's usage of the UFERI's youth militia, JUFERI, in violence against the Kasai supporters of the UDPS during his time as governor.

It is known to support greater autonomy for Katanga, and to be a BaLunda-ethnocentric party that sought to drive out the Kasai minority from the Katanga region.

References

1990 establishments in Zaire
Federalism in the Democratic Republic of the Congo
Federalist parties
Political parties established in 1990
Political parties in the Democratic Republic of the Congo
Separatism in the Democratic Republic of the Congo